Tennessee National Wildlife Refuge is a National Wildlife Refuge of the United States located along the shores of the Tennessee River in West Tennessee. It was established in 1945 where the impoundment of Kentucky Lake by the Tennessee Valley Authority has created a more-or-less permanent wetlands environment favored by many species of waterfowl. The entire refuge area is 51,359.46 acres (207.84 km²) in three units: From north to south (going upstream) they are Big Sandy (Benton and Henry counties), Duck River (Benton and Humphreys counties), and Busseltown (Decatur County).

References
 US Fish and Wildlife Service, Tennessee NWR

Protected areas of Benton County, Tennessee
Protected areas of Decatur County, Tennessee
Protected areas of Henry County, Tennessee
Protected areas of Humphreys County, Tennessee
National Wildlife Refuges in Tennessee
Wetlands of Tennessee
Landforms of Benton County, Tennessee
Landforms of Decatur County, Tennessee
Landforms of Henry County, Tennessee
Landforms of Humphreys County, Tennessee